The 1986–87 QMJHL season was the 18th season in the history of the Quebec Major Junior Hockey League. Ten teams played 70 games each in the schedule. The two last place teams from previous season both won their divisions. The Granby Bisons finished first overall in the regular season, winning their first Jean Rougeau Trophy since relocating from Sorel, Quebec. The Longueuil Chevaliers won their first President's Cup, defeating the Chicoutimi Saguenéens in the finals.

Final standings
Note: GP = Games played; W = Wins; L = Losses; T = Ties; Pts = Points; GF = Goals for; GA = Goals against

complete list of standings.

Scoring leaders
Note: GP = Games played; G = Goals; A = Assists; Pts = Points; PIM = Penalties in Minutes

 complete scoring statistics

Playoffs
Marc Fortier was the leading scorer of the playoffs with 44 points (17 goals, 27 assists).

Division semifinal round-robin standings
Note: GP = Games played; W = Wins; L = Losses; PTS = Points; GF = Goals For; GA = Goals Against 

Division finals
 Longueuil Chevaliers defeated Laval Titan 4 games to 3.
 Chicoutimi Saguenéens defeated Shawinigan Cataractes 4 games to 2.

Finals
 Longueuil Chevaliers defeated Chicoutimi Saguenéens 4 games to 1.

All-star teams
First team
 Goaltender - Robert Desjardins, Longueuil Chevaliers
 Left defence - Jean-Marc Richard, Chicoutimi Saguenéens  
 Right defence - Stephane Quintal, Granby Bisons 
 Left winger - Everett Sanipass, Granby Bisons
 Centreman - Marc Fortier, Chicoutimi Saguenéens 
 Right winger - Patrice Lefebvre, Shawinigan Cataractes   
 Coach - Guy Chouinard, Longueuil Chevaliers 
Second team
 Goaltender - Jimmy Waite, Chicoutimi Saguenéens   
 Left defence - Donald Dufresne, Longueuil Chevaliers 
 Right defence - Eric Desjardins, Granby Bisons 
 Left winger - Benoit Brunet, Hull Olympiques
 Centreman - Stephan Lebeau, Shawinigan Cataractes
 Right winger - Luc Beausoleil, Laval Titan & Patrice Tremblay, Chicoutimi Saguenéens
 Coach - Gaston Drapeau, Chicoutimi Saguenéens
 List of First/Second/Rookie team all-stars.

Trophies and awards
Team
President's Cup - Playoff Champions, Longueuil Chevaliers
Jean Rougeau Trophy - Regular Season Champions, Granby Bisons
Robert Lebel Trophy - Team with best GAA, Longueuil Chevaliers

Player
Michel Brière Memorial Trophy - Most Valuable Player, Robert Desjardins, Longueuil Chevaliers
Jean Béliveau Trophy - Top Scorer, Marc Fortier, Chicoutimi Saguenéens 
Guy Lafleur Trophy - Playoff MVP, Marc Saumier, Longueuil Chevaliers 
Jacques Plante Memorial Trophy - Best GAA, Robert Desjardins, Longueuil Chevaliers
Emile Bouchard Trophy - Defenceman of the Year, Jean-Marc Richard, Chicoutimi Saguenéens 
Mike Bossy Trophy - Best Pro Prospect, Pierre Turgeon, Granby Bisons 
Michel Bergeron Trophy - Offensive Rookie of the Year, Rob Murphy, Laval Voisins 
Raymond Lagacé Trophy - Defensive Rookie of the Year, Jimmy Waite, Chicoutimi Saguenéens 
Frank J. Selke Memorial Trophy - Most sportsmanlike player, Luc Beausoleil, Laval Voisins 
Marcel Robert Trophy - Best Scholastic Player, Patrice Tremblay, Chicoutimi Saguenéens

See also
1987 Memorial Cup
1987 NHL Entry Draft
1986–87 OHL season
1986–87 WHL season

External links
 Official QMJHL Website
 www.hockeydb.com/

Quebec Major Junior Hockey League seasons
QMJHL